Journal Square–33rd Street (via Hoboken) (JSQ-33 via HOB) is a rapid transit service operated by the Port Authority Trans-Hudson (PATH) railroad. It is colored yellow and blue on the PATH service map, and trains on this service display both yellow and blue marker lights. This service operates from Journal Square in Jersey City, New Jersey by way of the Uptown Hudson Tubes to 33rd Street in Midtown Manhattan, New York, with trains reversing direction mid-route at Hoboken Terminal. The  trip takes 26 minutes to complete.

Operation
This service operates from 11 p.m. to 6 a.m. on weekdays and all day on weekends and holidays. It combines PATH's two services to midtown Manhattan, Journal Square–33rd Street and Hoboken–33rd Street, into one during these off-peak hours. The Hoboken–World Trade Center service does not operate during the late-night hours or on weekends. Passengers wishing to travel from Hoboken to World Trade Center at these times must take the southbound Journal Square–33rd Street via Hoboken train from Hoboken and transfer at Grove Street to the northbound Newark–World Trade Center train.

History
The service originated shortly after the September 11 attacks, which destroyed the World Trade Center station. All service to lower Manhattan was suspended indefinitely, with two services operating via the Uptown Tubes, Newark-33rd Street and Hoboken-33rd Street. During overnight hours, all service was provided by the Newark–33rd Street (via Hoboken) branch until Exchange Place reopened on June 29, 2003. At that time, the NWK–33 (via HOB) service was truncated to Journal Square and assumed its current name, running on weekends as well.

The Hoboken station suffered severe damage from Hurricane Sandy, which devastated the PATH system in late October 2012. Due to the lengthy amount of time that was necessary to complete the repairs, service on the line was temporarily suspended. On December 19, 2012, the Hoboken station was reopened after repairs were completed, but the line did not resume service until early 2013 due to repairs in other areas of the PATH system.

Because of positive train control installation on the Uptown Hudson Tubes, the Journal Square–33rd Street via Hoboken service was mostly suspended on weekends from July to October 2018. Since all stations between Christopher and 33rd Streets were closed during the weekends, the service was replaced by the Journal Square–World Trade Center (via Hoboken) service on Saturdays, and the Journal Square–Hoboken service on Sundays and early Monday mornings. Around weekends, the JSQ–33 (via HOB) would still see an hour of service on Friday nights and an hour on Monday mornings before reverting to the three weekday services.

Station listing

References

PATH (rail system) services